Lacey's Farm Quarry is a 1,300 square metre geological Site of Special Scientific Interest near the town of Freshwater, Isle of Wight, notified in 1993.

Sources

 English Nature citation sheet for the site  (accessed 16 July 2006)

External links
 English Nature (SSSI information)

Sites of Special Scientific Interest on the Isle of Wight
Sites of Special Scientific Interest notified in 1993